Dignathia is a genus of African and Asian plants in the grass family.

 Species 
 Dignathia aristata Cope - Kenya
 Dignathia ciliata C.E.Hubb. - Ethiopia, Somalia
 Dignathia gracilis Stapf - Somalia, Kenya, Tanzania, Mozambique
 Dignathia hirtella Stapf - Ethiopia, Somalia, Kenya, Oman, Yemen, Gujarat
 Dignathia villosa C.E.Hubb. - Ethiopia, Somalia

References

Chloridoideae
Poaceae genera
Grasses of Africa
Grasses of Asia